A Singing Fairy is a 2010 Chinese romantic comedy film directed by Zhu Feng and produced by Peng Gang and Zheng Jinhao, starring Alec Su, Eva Huang, Wei Zongwan, Ariel Aisin-Gioro, and Che Yongli. It based on the story of the classic Chinese figure Liu Sanjie. A Singing Fairy was first released in China on 30 April 2010.

Plot
It tells the story of the Chinese-American musician Wei Wende and a Chinese ethnic minority women Liu Tiantian's marriage.

Cast
 Alec Su as Wei Wende, a Chinese-American musician who fell in love with Liu Tiantian.
 Eva Huang as Liu Tiantian, a Chinese ethnic minority women.
 Wei Zongwan as Lao Mo.
 Ariel Aisin-Gioro as A Juan.
 Che Yongli as A Mei, the tour guide.
 Qian Liuyin as A Yan.
 Guan Zongxiang as Wei Wende's grandpa.
 Guo Le as A Li.
 Chen Jing as A Juan's grandpa.
 Calvin Sun as A Liang.

Music
 Alec Su, Eva Huang - A Singing Fairy

Production
The movie was filmed in Guilin, Yizhou, and Luocheng.

Released
The film premiered in Beijing on 24 April 2010.

The film was a box-office and critical dud.

References

2010 films
Films set in Guangxi
Films shot in Guangxi
Chinese romantic comedy films
2010 romantic comedy films
2010s Mandarin-language films